Morne Balvine is a mountain located in Saint John, Dominica, on segment 11 of the Waitukubuli Trail. The estimate elevation is 404 feet above sea level.

References

Geography of Dominica